Sorullos are a fried cornmeal-based dish that is a staple of the Puerto Rican cuisine. Sorullos are served as a side dish or as appetizers (commonly known by the diminutive form sorullitos), and are sometimes stuffed with cheese. They can be served with mayoketchup, coffee or dusted in confectioners' sugar.

Description

Sorullo are made of a mix of steamed water or milk, sugar, salt, butter, flour, and cornmeal, formed as sticks or logs, then fried. The flavor is usually lightly sweet, but can also be savory. Sorullos are best served hot and the texture is crisp on the outside and dense and soft in the inside.

Varieties

Sorullos de guayaba y queso are filled with guava and cream cheese or queso blanco.

Sorullos can also be stuffed with cheese. Gouda cheese (known as queso de papa), cheddar cheese, and mozzarella are the most popular for stuffing manchego, parmesan, and  montebello (a local cheese) can be grated in to the corn dough.

There are also recipes containing bits of corn kernels, coconut milk (known as sorullos de coco), and green or yellow boiled mashed plantains added. (Known as sorullos de platano).

Serving
Sorullitos are found throughout Puerto Rico. They are considered a side dish, usually served alone as a snack with guava sauce, mayo-ketchup or as a  French fry substitute for burgers and sandwiches. They can also be served with coffee in which they are dunked.

See also

 Puerto Rican cuisine
 Hushpuppy
 List of maize dishes
 List of stuffed dishes

References

External links
 Sorullos recipe

Puerto Rican cuisine
Latin American cuisine
Deep fried foods
Maize dishes
Stuffed dishes